Volchikhinsky District is an administrative and municipal district (raion), one of the fifty-nine in Altai Krai, Russia. It is located in the southwest of the krai. Its administrative center is the rural locality (a selo) of Volchikha. As of the 2010 Census, the total population of the district was 19,703, with the population of Volchikha accounting for 52.8% of that number.

History
The district was established on September 24, 1924 within Omsk Governorate and existed until February 1, 1963. It was re-established on January 14, 1965.

References

Notes

Sources

Исполнительный комитет Алтайского краевого Совета народных депутатов. Архивный отдел. Государственный архив Алтайского края. "Справочник административно-территориальных изменений на Алтае, 1917–1980" (Reference Book of the Administrative-Territorial Changes in Altai, 1917–1980). Барнаул, Алтайское книжное издательство, 1987.

Districts of Altai Krai
States and territories established in 1924
States and territories disestablished in 1963
States and territories established in 1965
